is a city tram station on the Takaoka Kidō Line located in Takaoka, Toyama Prefecture, Japan.

Surrounding area
JR West Himi Line Nōmachi Station

Shin Nomachi Station